Linda Simensky is a production manager of various works of animation. Simensky served as an executive for Nickelodeon and Cartoon Network. She is partly responsible for the development of shows such as Dexter's Laboratory, Samurai Jack, Courage the Cowardly Dog, The Powerpuff Girls, Ed, Edd n Eddy, Codename: Kids Next Door, Foster's Home for Imaginary Friends, Johnny Bravo, and others.

Early life 
Simensky graduated from University of Pennsylvania in 1985.

Career 
Simensky received the June Foray Award in 2000.

On October 28, 2003, the Public Broadcasting Service appointed Simensky the position of senior director of children's programming.

In 2021, she joined Duolingo as head of animation and scripted content.

Views of gender in animation 
In the 2008 book, Art in Motion: Animation Aesthetics, Simensky stated that many male animators find difficulty in creating strong, positive female characters with substance that can serve as role models. When she questioned the creators of Rocko's Modern Life, one of the series which she produced, why the women in the series were invariably drawn to be well-endowed, she was told that the animators believed that drawing women "the traditional way" was easier. Simensky described the creators as "talented guys" who formed "a boy's club" and added that "we pushed them to be funny, but a lot of their women are stereotypical."

References

External links 
 
 Women in the Animation Industry--Some Thoughts
 Supporting Independents: Five Champions
 O Canada: - Canadian animators

Cartoon Network executives
Women television executives
Nickelodeon executives
Living people
University of Pennsylvania alumni
Year of birth missing (living people)

Duolingo